Horace Hunt (15 July 1907 – 15 October 1984) was an Australian cricketer. He played two first-class cricket matches for Victoria between 1928 and 1930.

See also
 List of Victoria first-class cricketers

References

External links
 

1907 births
1984 deaths
Australian cricketers
Victoria cricketers
People from Stawell, Victoria